Carl Thor Hanson (May 7, 1928 – January 12, 2008) was a United States Navy vice admiral. He served as Director of the Joint Staff from June 22, 1979 to June 30, 1981. He attended the United States Naval Academy (Class of 1950) and was also a Rhodes scholar.

Personal Life
Carl Thor Hanson is father to punk rock drummer, Ivor Hanson. Circa April 1981, while serving as Director of the Joint Staff, he and his family shared living quarters with the vice president in the Naval Observatory. His son's band at the time, State of Alert, held their practices there and had to be let in by Secret Service agents.

References

United States Navy admirals
1928 births
2008 deaths
People from Amarillo, Texas
United States Naval Academy alumni
Military personnel from Texas